Kari Raustein (born 27 July 1965) is a Norwegian politician for the Progress Party.

She served as a deputy representative to the Parliament of Norway from Rogaland during the term 2013–2017. She has been a member of Stavanger city council.

References

1965 births
Living people
Deputy members of the Storting
Progress Party (Norway) politicians
Politicians from Stavanger
Women members of the Storting